Jalen Seegars is an American professional basketball player for APOP Paphos of the Cypriot League.

High school career
During his high school stint, Seegars were teammates with Bam Adebayo, who would go on to become a player for the Miami Heat of the NBA.

Collegiate career

UNC Asheville (2017–2019)
After high school, Seegars committed to play for UNC Asheville as he chose the same university as his tertiary school. He formally signed to play on June 1, 2017. In just his second collegiate game, he scored 10 points and grabbed 4 rebounds in a 92–60 victory over Lees–McRae.

Fayetteville State (2019–present)
After two years at UNC Asheville, Seegars transferred to Fayetteville State University to continue his studies and his collegiate career, and immediately, he made an impact on the court to lead the Broncos into its winning ways.

On December 19, 2019, Seegars scored a collegiate-high of 39 points in an overtime victory over the Lincoln Lions.

On February 26, 2022, Seegars scored 15 points to help Fayetteville State clinch the 2022 CIAA Tournament championship game and subsequently, he was awarded the MVP of the said game.

Career statistics

College

|-
| style="text-align:left;"| 2017–18
| style="text-align:left;"| UNC Asheville Bulldogs
| 19 || 19 || 11.9 || .417 || .294 || .591 || 1.2 || .6 || .3 || .3 || 2.5
|-
| style="text-align:left;"| 2018–19
| style="text-align:left;"| UNC Asheville Bulldogs
| 29 || 29 || 20.9 || .382 || .356 || .714 || 3.4 || .6 || .7 || .8 || 4.5
|-
| style="text-align:left;"| 2019–20
| style="text-align:left;"| Fayetteville State Broncos
| 30 || 30 || 30.6 || .434 || .398 || .742 || 6.1 || 1.1 || .4 || 1.4 || 15.3
|-
| style="text-align:left;"| 2021–22
| style="text-align:left;"| Fayetteville State Broncos
| 30 || 30 || 32.9 || .425 || .383 || .692 || 5.4 || 1.1 || .8 || 1.2 || 16.2

References

External links
Jalen Seegars

1990s births
Living people
African-American basketball players
American expatriate basketball people in Cyprus
American men's basketball players
Basketball players from North Carolina
Fayetteville State Broncos basketball players
Guards (basketball)
People from High Point, North Carolina
UNC Asheville Bulldogs men's basketball players